Ashok Anand is an Indian politician. He was elected to the  Puducherry Legislative Assembly from Thattanchavady,  Puducherry in the 2016 Puducherry Legislative Assembly election as a member of the All India NR Congress.

References

Living people
Puducherry MLAs 2016–2021
Indian National Congress politicians from Puducherry
All India NR Congress politicians
People from Puducherry
Year of birth missing (living people)